Prethcamide (trade name Micoren) is a respiratory stimulant composed of two related drugs, cropropamide and crotethamide. It was developed by Ciba-Geigy.

References

Carboxamides
Combination drugs